The Dodge Sidewinder is a concept car unveiled by Dodge in 1997 at the SEMA convention  in Las Vegas. It was based on a design by Chrysler's Mark Allen, only two years after he graduated from design school. Officially called the Dodge Dakota Sidewinder, it uses the front-mounted, Viper GTS-R engine to power the rear wheels, sitting on a chassis built by Riley & Scott. It was envisioned as the futuristic version of a Dodge Dakota convertible. 

References

Sidewinder